Swan Marsh is a town in the Western District of Victoria, Australia.

The area around Swan Marsh was first settled by Europeans in the mid 19th century. The area was described as ""wet, marshy land, forest and some beautiful cleared rich gently sloping high land." The swamps were drained using bullock teams and hand labour to install large drains—the beginnings of the Tirrengower Drainage Scheme. The name "Swan Marsh" was derived from the swans prevalent in the local area. In 1907, the area saw closer settlement with  blocks created and allocated mainly to young families. The Swan Marsh dairy, operated by the Colac and District Company, was built in 1901. From the 1930s to its closure in 1956, the dairy produced casein.

Swan Marsh today has four businesses: the post office, the general store/take away food outlet, a peat mine and a water carter. Community facilities include the football ground/recreation reserve, public hall, tennis courts and a speedway circuit. The town hosts a Country Fire Authority volunteer brigade. Swan Marsh Primary School services the town.

References

External links

Towns in Victoria (Australia)